A bouleuterion  (bouleutērion), also translated as   and  was a building in ancient Greece which housed the council of citizens (boulē) of a democratic city state. These representatives assembled at the bouleuterion to confer and decide about public affairs. There are several extant bouleuteria around Greece and its former colonies. It should not be confused with the Prytaneion, which housed the executive council of the assembly and often served as the boule's mess hall.

Athens 

The Athenian Boule is better known as the Council of 500. Solon was credited with its formation in 594 BC as an assembly of 100 men each from Athens's four original tribes. At the adoption of the new constitution around 507 BC, this was changed to 50 men each from the 10 newly created tribes. Each served a one-year term.

The Old Bouleuterion was built on the west side of the Agora below the Agoraios Kolonos around 500 BC. It was almost square and included an oblong antechamber and a main council chamber, a large rectangular egg with wooden benches arranged in rows along the walls. The roof was supported by five columns. It is now better known as the Metroon ("House of the Mother") since it was repurposed as her temple after the construction of the New Bouleuterion. 

The New Bouleuterion was built west of the old building in the late 5th century BC. It was bigger and more sophisticated, with an amphitheater-like system of twelve levels of semicircular benches. Both the Old and the New Bouleuterion used the nearby Tholos.

Olympia 

The Bouleuterion of Ancient Olympia was shaped like an early Greek temple, a kind of square horse-shoe. It had a tiered seating arrangement and was located near the city's agora.

Other bouleuteria
Other notable bouleuteria are located at:
 Anemourion (Anamur, Turkey)
 Aphrodisias (Geyre, Turkey)
 Argos in Greece
 Ancient Mantineia (Gortsouli, Arkadia), Glanon (St-Rémy, France)
 Lemnos in Greece
 Paestum (Italy)
 Philippopolis (Plovdiv, Bulgaria) – Bouleuterion of Philippopolis
Priene (Güllübahçe Turun, Turkey)
 Messene (Messini, Greece)
 Termessos (Güllük Dağı, Turkey)
 Troy (Hisarlik, Turkey)

See also
 Curia

External links 

 Bouleuterion: Birthplace of Democracy
 Bouleterion at Mantineia

Ancient Greek buildings and structures
Legislative buildings
Greek words and phrases